The 2021 Netball Superleague season was the sixteenth season of the Netball Superleague, the elite domestic netball competition in the United Kingdom. The season started on 12 February 2021. Manchester Thunder were the defending champions, as they won the 2019 season and the 2020 season was cancelled after three rounds due to the COVID-19 pandemic. Because of the ongoing pandemic, the first nine weeks of matches were held at Studio 001 in Wakefield, and the remaining matches were held at the Copper Box Arena in London. All matches were originally scheduled to be held behind closed doors, though from week 17 onwards, limited numbers of fans were permitted into matches, due to a change in the UK Government guidelines.

In the league section, Loughborough Lightning finished top, ahead of Manchester Thunder, Team Bath and Leeds Rhinos, who finished second, third and fourth respectively. The top three teams finished on the same number of points, and were separated by goal difference. Rhinos had their last two matches cancelled, as the squad had to isolate after one player tested positive for COVID-19. They were awarded the points and therefore qualified for the playoffs. In the semi-finals, Loughborough Lightning beat Leeds Rhinos and Team Bath beat Manchester Thunder. Lightning beat Bath in the final to win the competition.

Overview

Format
The 2021 Netball Superleague season consisted of 11 teams; Leeds Rhinos joined the league for the first time. The 2021 season used 12-minute quarters for player welfare reasons, reduced from the 15-minute quarters played in previous seasons. League-stage matches could end in a draw; previously, extra time was used to determine a winner. On each match day a team could use a squad of 12 players.

The fixture list consisted of 20 rounds, running from 12 February to 21 June. The semifinals were held on 26 June, and the grand final was on 27 June. Due to the COVID-19 pandemic, all matches were expected to be held behind closed doors. All players had to take COVID-19 tests twice a week. The first nine weeks of matches were held at Studio 001 in Wakefield, and the remaining matches were held at the Copper Box Arena in London. All matches were broadcast on Sky Sports (either on television or via YouTube), and start times were scheduled two hours apart so that they could all be televised. In May 2021, it was announced that for rounds 17 to 20 of matches, 1,000 fans would be permitted into matches, due to a change in the UK Government guidelines. The same number of fans were permitted for the play-off matches.

Teams

Source:

Squads
Each team was allowed to have 10 players, 9 of whom were covered by the sport's salary cap. Teams could also register an additional five training players. Squads were only allowed 2 non-EU players, and these players were not allowed to play in the same third of the court simultaneously. The player signing window ran from 17 August to 30 October 2020.

During the player signing window, Australians Madi Browne and Donnell Wallam signed for Leeds Rhinos, South African Lefébre Rademan signed for London Pulse, and South African Ine-Marí Venter signed for Saracens Mavericks. Jamaican Malysha Kelly signed for Severn Stars, Jamaican Gezelle Allison signed for Wasps, and Zimbabwe captain Felisitus Kwangwa signed for Surrey Storm. At the domestic level, Leeds Rhinos signed English players Jade Clarke from Wasps and Vicki Oyesola from Loughborough Lightning. Beth Cobden signed for Loughborough Lightning. Prior to the season, Manchester Thunder suspended one player for breaching COVID-19 restrictions on New Year's Eve 2020.

Table

League stage
Source:

Rounds 1 & 2

Round 3

Round 4

Round 5 & 6

Round 7

Round 8

Round 9

Round 10 & 11

Round 12

Rounds 13 & 14

Round 15

Round 16

Rounds 17 & 18
From Round 17 onwards, matches were held with a limited number of spectators.

Round 19
The match between Surrey Storm and Wasps was postponed due to one Wasps player testing positive for COVID-19. The match was rearranged for 21 June after all COVID tests came back negative.

Round 20
Leeds Rhinos had their last two matches against London Pulse and Celtic Dragons cancelled, as their squad had to isolate after one of their squad tested positive for COVID-19. As Rhinos had beaten Pulse and Dragons earlier in the season, they were awarded the points for both matches, and qualified for the play-offs as a result.

Finals series
In the finals series, the team finishing first in the league section played the team finishing fourth, and the team that finished second played the third-placed team. The top three teams finished the league section on the same number of points, and were separated by goal difference.

Source for fixtures:

Semi-finals

Grand Final
Loughborough Lightning had previously played in three Grand Finals, whilst Team Bath had not appeared in a Grand Final sine 2013. Lightning took the lead in the first quarter, and were 11–7 up after one quarter. They maintained the lead, and by the end of the third quarter, they were ahead 31–24. Lightning won the grand final for the first time.

Notes

References

External links
 Official Website

 
2021
2021 in English netball
2021 in Welsh women's sport
2021 in Scottish women's sport
2021 in English women's sport